Stephen is a city in Marshall County, Minnesota, United States. The population was 592 at the 2020 census.

History
A post office called Stephen has been in operation since 1883. The city was named for George Stephen, a railroad official.

Geography

Demographics

2010 census
As of the census of 2010, there were 658 people, 304 households, and 174 families living in the city. The racial makeup of the city was 97.9% White, 0.2% Native American, 1.7% from other races, and 0.3% from two or more races. Hispanic or Latino of any race were 10.0% of the population.

There were 304 households, of which 21.4% had children under the age of 18 living with them, 48.4% were married couples living together, 5.6% had a female householder with no husband present, 3.3% had a male householder with no wife present, and 42.8% were non-families. 40.1% of all households were made up of individuals, and 19.7% had someone living alone who was 65 years of age or older. The average household size was 2.16 and the average family size was 2.93.

The median age in the city was 46.8 years. 20.8% of residents were under the age of 18; 4.9% were between the ages of 18 and 24; 21.4% were from 25 to 44; 29.7% were from 45 to 64; and 23.1% were 65 years of age or older. The gender makeup of the city was 49.4% male and 50.6% female.

2000 census
As of the census of 2000, there were 708 people, 292 households, and 188 families living in the city. The racial makeup of the city was 93.36% White, 0.71% Native American, 0.14% Asian, 4.66% from other races, and 1.13% from two or more races. Hispanic or Latino of any race were 8.19% of the population.

There were 292 households, out of which 28.4% had children under the age of 18 living with them, 56.5% were married couples living together, 4.5% had a female householder with no husband present, and 35.3% were non-families. 33.2% of all households were made up of individuals, and 22.6% had someone living alone who was 65 years of age or older.  The average household size was 2.42 and the average family size was 3.13.

In the city, the population was spread out, with 26.0% under the age of 18, 7.1% from 18 to 24, 20.6% from 25 to 44, 23.7% from 45 to 64, and 22.6% who were 65 years of age or older.  The median age was 43 years. For every 100 females, there were 99.4 males.  For every 100 females age 18 and over, there were 95.5 males.

The median income for a household in the city was $33,207, and the median income for a family was $42,969. Males had a median income of $31,103 versus $21,667 for females. The per capita income for the city was $17,152.  About 3.3% of families and 6.2% of the population were below the poverty line, including 2.4% of those under age 18 and 12.7% of those age 65 or over.

References

External links
City of Stephen

Cities in Marshall County, Minnesota
Cities in Minnesota